Lilopristone (INN) (developmental code names ZK-98734, ZK-734) is a synthetic, steroidal antiprogestogen with additional antiglucocorticoid activity which was developed by Schering and was patented in 1985. It is described as an abortifacient and endometrial contraceptive. The drug differs from mifepristone only in the structure of its C17α side chain, and is said to have much reduced antiglucocorticoid activity in comparison.

See also
 Aglepristone
 Onapristone
 Telapristone
 Toripristone

References

Further reading

 
 

Abortifacients
Alkene derivatives
Dimethylamino compounds
Antiglucocorticoids
Antiprogestogens
Estranes
Enones
Conjugated dienes